Hasarius cheliceroides is a jumping spider species in the genus Hasarius that lives in Cameroon. It was described in 2002.

References

Endemic fauna of Cameroon
Salticidae
Spiders of Africa
Arthropods of Cameroon
Spiders described in 2002
Taxa named by Wanda Wesołowska